The 2009–10 season was Eintracht Frankfurt's 110th season and their fifth consecutive season in the Bundesliga.

Players

First-team squad
Squad at end of season

Left club during season

Transfers

Results

Friendlies

Indoor tournaments

Bundesliga

DFB-Pokal

Source:

References

Notes

Sources

 

 Official English Eintracht website 
 Eintracht-Archiv.de
 2009–10 Eintracht Frankfurt season at Fussballdaten.de 

2009-10
German football clubs 2009–10 season